Seksenler (lit. the Eighties) is a Turkish nostalgic romantic comedy show that started airing in 2012. The series takes place in the 80s Turkey and shows the daily life of a neighborhood. The series ended in 2017 after the 228th episode, but got a reboot in 2019, continuing the original story.

References

Turkish comedy television series
2012 Turkish television series debuts
2017 Turkish television series endings